Shennington is an unincorporated community located in the town of Byron at the edge of Monroe County, Wisconsin, United States on Wisconsin Highway 21.

History
A post office called Shennington was established in 1893, and remained in operation until it was discontinued in 1933. The community was named for Fred M. Shenning, founder and first merchant.

Notes

Unincorporated communities in Monroe County, Wisconsin
Unincorporated communities in Wisconsin